This page provides supplementary chemical data on aluminium oxide.

Material Safety Data Sheet  
SIRI
Science Stuff

Structure and properties

Thermodynamic properties

Spectral data

References 

Chemical data pages
Chemical data pages cleanup